Cobalt chloride (cobalt paper) may refer to:

 Cobalt(II) chloride (CoCl2)
 Cobalt(III) chloride (CoCl3)